Marianne Florman (born 1 June 1964) is a former Danish team handball player and Olympic champion. She won a gold medal with the Danish national team at the 1996 Summer Olympics in Atlanta.

Personal life
She participated in the first season of the Danish version of Dancing with the Stars.

References

1964 births
Living people
Danish female handball players
Olympic gold medalists for Denmark
Handball players at the 1996 Summer Olympics
Olympic medalists in handball
Medalists at the 1996 Summer Olympics